The National Indigenous Music Awards 2012 are the 9th annual National Indigenous Music Awards.

The nominations were announced on 20 July 2012 and the awards ceremony was held on 11 August 2012.

Performers
Troy Cassar-Daley
Warren H. Williams and The Warumungu Songmen
The Medics with Bunna Lawrie
Yabu Band
East Journey
Sunrize Band 
Lajamanu Teenage Band
Thelma Plum - "Blowin' in the Wind"

Hall of Fame Inductees 
 Jimmy Little, Sunrize Band & Lajamanu Teenage Band

Jimmy Little (aka Dr James Oswald Little) (1 March 1937 – 2 April 2012) was an Australian Aboriginal musician, actor and teacher from the Yorta Yorta people and was raised on the Cummeragunja Reserve. At the ARIA Music Awards of 1999, Little won the ARIA Award for Best Adult Contemporary Album and was inducted into he ARIA Hall of Fame. 

Sunrize Band are a rock band from the remote community of Maningrida in the Arnhem Land. They were the first band signed to Triple J's record label.

Lajamanu Teenage Band are a rock band from Lajamanu. Their songs are sung in Warlpiri and English and at the ARIA Music Awards of 1999, the band were nominated for the ARIA Award for Best World Music Album.

G.R. Bururrawanga Memorial Award
 East Journey

Triple J Unearthed National Indigenous Winner
 Thelma Plum (The inaugural Triple J Unearthed National Indigenous Winner)

Thelma Plum, born on 21 December 1994 is a Gamilaraay woman from Delungra. Plum uploaded the songs "Blackbird" and "Father Said" onto Triple J Unearthed in May 2012.

Awards
Artist of the Year

Best New Talent of the Year

Album of the Year

Film Clip of the Year

Song of the Year

Cover Art of the Year

Traditional Song of the Year

NT School Band of the Year

References

2012 in Australian music
2012 music awards
National Indigenous Music Awards